The second round of the 2002–03 UEFA Cup was contested between 29 October and 14 November 2002. A total of 48 teams participated in this round, with the 24 winners joining the eight Champions League group stage third-placed teams in the third round.

Format
In the second round, each tie was played over two legs, with each team playing one leg at home. The team that scored more goals on aggregate over the two legs advanced to the next round. If the aggregate score was level, the away goals rule was applied, i.e., the team that scored more goals away from home over the two legs advanced. If away goals were also equal, then thirty minutes of extra time were played, divided into two fifteen-minute halves. The away goals rule was again applied after extra time, i.e., if there were goals scored during extra time and the aggregate score was still level, the visiting team advanced by virtue of more away goals scored. If no goals were scored during extra time, the tie was decided by penalty shoot-out.

Qualified teams
A total of 48 teams contested this round, all of which advanced from the first round.

Seeding
The draw was held on 8 October 2002 in Nyon, Switzerland. Before the draw, the 48 teams were divided into 24 seeded and 24 unseeded teams, based on their 2002 UEFA club coefficients. For convenience of the draw and to avoid pairing of teams from the same association, the teams were distributed into four groups of twelve teams, each containing an equal number of seeded and unseeded teams.
In the draw, a seeded team from each group was paired with an unseeded team from the same group. The first team to be drawn played the first leg at home.

Summary
The first leg matches were played on 29 and 31 October, and the second leg matches were played on 7, 12 and 14 November 2002. All times in CET (UTC+1).

|}

Matches

Real Betis won 4–0 on aggregate.

Schalke 04 won 3–2 on aggregate.

Bordeaux won 3–1 on aggregate.

Hertha BSC won 5–0 on aggregate.

Fulham won 5–1 on aggregate.

Denizlispor won 2–1 on aggregate.

Stuttgart won 2–0 on aggregate.

1–1 on aggregate. Sturm Graz won 8–7 on penalties.

Slavia Prague won 5–4 on aggregate.

Paris Saint-Germain won 3–0 on aggregate.

Panathinaikos won 5–2 on aggregate.

PAOK won 3–2 on aggregate.

Lazio won 2–1 on aggregate.

Anderlecht won 6–1 on aggregate.

Porto won 3–0 on aggregate.

Vitesse won 5–4 on aggregate.

1–1 on aggregate. Slovan Liberec won 4–2 on penalties.

Beşiktaş won 2–1 on aggregate.

Wisła Kraków won 5–3 on aggregate.

Leeds United won 5–1 on aggregate.

Celtic won 3–0 on aggregate.

Málaga won 4–2 on aggregate.

Celta Vigo won 4–1 on aggregate.

Boavista won 3–1 on aggregate.

References

Second round